Cybernet (also known as Interactive) was a weekly video gaming magazine programme, originally broadcast overnight on the ITV network in the United Kingdom. The programme was commissioned by Yorkshire Television and produced by Capricorn Programmes<ref>Capricorn Programmes Filmography on BFI Retrieved on 2007.03.14 </ref> (who also produced the similar Movies, Games and Videos) and also aired on GBC TV in Gibraltar. It was also broadcast on various television stations all around the world.

The programme featured reviews, previews, tips and reports on video gaming and computer technology. It began airing on the former children's satellite and cable network TCC (who also aired various television series based on video games and television series related to video games such as the Earthworm Jim, Super Mario Bros. and Sonic the Hedgehog cartoons) in 1995, before airing on ITV on terrestrial television.

Broadcasting

Besides ITV and TCC (in the United Kingdom), Cybernet was broadcast all over the world, including:

 4 Channel+ТНТ (07.09.1996-15.02.1997)(Russia, Ekaterinburg)
 MAD TV (Greece)
 Multishow (The Netherlands and Brazil)
 OnceTV (Mexico)
 Cablín (Argentina)
 Canal 13 (Chile)
 TG4 (Ireland)
 SuperMax (The Czech Republic)
 The Kids' Channel (Israel)
 Premiere 12 and Mediacorp Channel 5 (Singapore)
 TV3 (Estonia)
 NS+ (Yugoslavia)
 2M TV (Morocco)
 CNBC-e (Turkey)
 Fox Kids (Australia)
 Fun Channel, a defunct children's cable channel (Middle East) 
 Channel 33 (United Arab Emirates)
 TV2 and Astro Ria (Malaysia)
 IBC 3 and UBC (Thailand)
 ATV Home and ATV World (Hong Kong)
 Bahrain TV Channel 55 (Bahrain)
 Bop TV and SABC2 (South Africa)
 RTB (Brunei)
 SkjárEinn and the 4 channel (Iceland)
 MNCTV (Indonesia)
 ATV Stavropol (Russia)
 TVI (Portugal)
 Chinese Television Network (Taiwan)
 KTV2 (Kuwait)

Voice-overs
During its thirteen-year run, Cybernet'' was presented out-of-vision by a number of voiceover artists:

Steve Priestly (1996, 1998)
Lucy Longhurst (1994–2002)
Steve Truitt (2002–2004)
Catherine Fox (2004–2008)

References

External links
Cybernet titles

1995 British television series debuts
2008 British television series endings
British non-fiction television series
ITV (TV network) original programming
Television series by Yorkshire Television
Television shows about video games
Video game culture